Lappajärvi Church is a Lutheran church located in Lappajärvi, Finland. The church was designed by Matti Honka and built 1765.

References

Lutheran churches in Finland